The Groton Leatherboard Company is a historic former factory complex at 6 W. Main Street in West Groton, Massachusetts. It manufactured leatherboard, a bonded leather made by pulping and compressing scrap leather, waste paper and wood pulp, but went out of business. The structure has since been renovated and adapted into senior housing called RiverCourt Residences. It was added to the National Register of Historic Places in 2002.

The factory was built in 1916 on the site of an earlier saw and grist mill, which operated by waterpower from the Squannacook River. The original mill was established by the Tarbell family, a name prominent in Groton history since its settlement. The present complex's access road is flanked by brick houses built by brothers of that family; the Col. Abel Tarbell House is today a bed-and-breakfast, while the Asa Tarbell House is a mixed-use annex of the River Court senior housing facility. In 1862, artist Edmund C. Tarbell was born in the latter.

See also
National Register of Historic Places listings in Middlesex County, Massachusetts

References

External links
 RiverCourt Residences (the former Groton Leatherboard Co. factory)
 Fall foliage at RiverCourt on YouTube

Historic districts in Middlesex County, Massachusetts
Industrial buildings and structures on the National Register of Historic Places in Massachusetts
Buildings and structures in Groton, Massachusetts
National Register of Historic Places in Middlesex County, Massachusetts
Historic districts on the National Register of Historic Places in Massachusetts
Leather industry